The following television stations broadcast on digital channel 36 in the United States:

 K36AB-D in Lawton, Oklahoma
 K36AC-D in Yuma, Colorado, on virtual channel 47, which rebroadcasts K21NZ-D
 K36AE-D in Clarkdale, Arizona, on virtual channel 10, which rebroadcasts KSAZ-TV
 K36AI-D in Parowan/Enoch, etc., Utah
 K36AK-D in Blanding/Monticello, Utah, on virtual channel 13, which rebroadcasts KSTU
 K36BA-D in Burns, Oregon
 K36BQ-D in Pahrump, Nevada
 K36BW-D in Thompson Falls, Montana
 K36BX-D in Coos Bay, Oregon
 K36CA-D in Memphis, Texas
 K36CC-D in Tulia, Texas
 K36CW-D in Dodson, Montana
 K36CX-D in Boulder, Montana
 K36DB-CD in Avon/Vail, Colorado, on virtual channel 36
 K36DI-D in Santa Rosa, New Mexico
 K36DK-D in Joplin, Montana
 K36DP-D in Pendleton, Oregon
 K36EW-D in College Place, Washington
 K36FF-D in Shurz, Nevada
 K36FG-D in Hood River, etc., Oregon, on virtual channel 10, which rebroadcasts KOPB-TV
 K36FM-D in Beaver, etc., Utah
 K36FQ-D in Wagon Mound, New Mexico
 K36FS-D in Randolph, Utah
 K36FT-D in Santa Clara, etc., Utah, on virtual channel 11, which rebroadcasts KBYU-TV
 K36FZ-D in Meadview, Arizona
 K36GJ-D in Agana, Guam
 K36GL-D in Lovelock, Nevada
 K36GQ-D in Parlin, Colorado, on virtual channel 13, which rebroadcasts K13AV-D
 K36GU-D in Rockaway Beach, Oregon, on virtual channel 10, which rebroadcasts KOPB-TV
 K36GX-D in Basalt, Colorado
 K36HA-D in Elko, Nevada
 K36HH-D in Susanville, etc., California
 K36HM-D in Fort Dick, California
 K36IB-D in Midland, etc., Oregon
 K36IF-D in Orangeville, Utah
 K36IG-D in Antimony, Utah
 K36IH-D in Ignacio, Colorado
 K36II-D in Joplin, Missouri
 K36IJ-D in Anahola, etc., Hawaii
 K36IK-D in Delta/Oak City, etc., Utah
 K36IL-D in Hanna & Tabiona, Utah
 K36IM-D in Duchesne, etc., Utah, on virtual channel 13, which rebroadcasts KSTU
 K36IO-D in Manhattan, Kansas
 K36IQ-D in Vernal, etc., Utah, on virtual channel 14, which rebroadcasts KJZZ-TV
 K36IR-D in Garrison, etc., Utah
 K36IY-D in Weatherford, Oklahoma
 K36JB-D in Cripple Creek, Colorado
 K36JD-D in Jackson, Wyoming
 K36JH-D in Barstow, California, on virtual channel 36
 K36JO-D in Cheyenne, Wyoming
 K36JS-D in Grants, New Mexico
 K36JT-D in Clear Creek, Utah
 K36JV-D in East Price, Utah
 K36JW-D in Spring Glen, Utah
 K36JX-D in Many Farms, Arizona
 K36JZ-D in Roseburg, Oregon
 K36KD-D in Tierra Amarilla, New Mexico
 K36KE-D in Ardmore, Oklahoma
 K36KH-D in Alexandria, Minnesota, on virtual channel 22, which rebroadcasts KAWB
 K36KI-D in Fillmore, etc., Utah
 K36KN-D in Eureka, Nevada
 K36KR-D in Elmo/Big Arm, Montana
 K36KW-D in Redwood Falls, Minnesota, on virtual channel 36
 K36KZ-D in Max, Minnesota, on virtual channel 13, which rebroadcasts WIRT-DT
 K36LA-D in Kabetogama, Minnesota
 K36LB-D in Cheyenne Wells, Colorado
 K36LD-D in College Station, Texas
 K36LE-D in Manila, etc., Utah
 K36LF-D in Taos, New Mexico
 K36LU-D in Ely, Nevada
 K36LW-D in Williams, Minnesota
 K36LX-D in Jacks Cabin, Colorado, on virtual channel 4, which rebroadcasts K04DH-D
 K36LZ-D in Garden Valley, Idaho
 K36MI-D in Fountain Green, Utah
 K36MU-D in Texarkana, Arkansas
 K36NB-D in Incline Village, Nevada
 K36ND-D in Victoria, Texas
 K36NE-D in Las Vegas, Nevada
 K36NN-D in West Plains, Missouri
 K36NO-D in Alton, etc., Utah
 K36NP-D in Baker Valley, Oregon
 K36NQ-D in Altus, Oklahoma
 K36NR-D in Seiling, Oklahoma
 K36NV-D in Strong City, Oklahoma
 K36NX-D in Pringle, South Dakota
 K36NZ-D in Clarkston, Washington
 K36OA-D in Red Lake, Minnesota, on virtual channel 9, which rebroadcasts KAWE
 K36OB-D in Verdi, Nevada
 K36OD-D in North La Pine, Oregon
 K36OE-D in Garfield County, Utah
 K36OF-D in Ursine, Nevada
 K36OH-D in Fremont, Utah
 K36OI-D in Manti/Ephraim, Utah, on virtual channel 30, which rebroadcasts KUCW
 K36OJ-D in Rainier, Oregon, on virtual channel 8, which rebroadcasts KGW
 K36OM-D in Tropic, Utah
 K36ON-D in Escalante, Utah
 K36OO-D in Boulder, Utah
 K36OP-D in Hanksville, Utah
 K36OQ-D in Caineville, Utah
 K36OR-D in Logan, Utah
 K36OS-D in Whitehall, Montana
 K36OT-D in Coalville, Utah
 K36OU-D in Mountain View, Wyoming
 K36OV-D in Wanship, Utah
 K36OW-D in Henefer & Echo, Utah
 K36OX-D in Samak, Utah
 K36OY-D in Sterling, Colorado, on virtual channel 7, which rebroadcasts KMGH-TV
 K36OZ-D in Hakalau, Hawaii
 K36PA-D in Kanarraville, etc., Utah
 K36PB-D in Lewistown, Montana
 K36PC-D in Emery, Utah
 K36PD-D in Green River, Utah
 K36PE-D in Peach Springs, Arizona
 K36PF-D in Ferron, Utah
 K36PJ-D in Howard, Montana
 K36PK-D in Peoa, etc., Utah
 K36PL-D in Park City, Utah, on virtual channel 45
 K36PM-D in Salmon, Idaho
 K36PN-D in Beowawe, Nevada
 K36PO-D in Winnemucca, Nevada
 K36PP-D in Farmington, etc., New Mexico
 K36PS-D in Julesburg, Colorado, on virtual channel 7, which rebroadcasts KMGH-TV
 K36PT-D in Haxtun, Colorado, on virtual channel 7, which rebroadcasts KMGH-TV
 K36PU-D in Pioche, Nevada
 K36PV-D in Gallup, New Mexico
 K36PW-D in Priest Lake, Idaho
 K36PX-D in Caliente, Nevada
 K36PY-D in Pagosa Springs, Colorado
 K36PZ-D in Big Spring, Texas
 K36QA-D in Lufkin, Texas
 K36QB-D in Cortez, Colorado
 K36QD-D in Omaha, Nebraska
 K36QM-D in Iowa, Louisiana
 K39CZ-D in Aberdeen, South Dakota
 K39JX-D in Livingston, etc., Montana
 K45CH-D in Fort Peck, Montana
 K47GI-D in Grants Pass, Oregon
 K49IG-D in Yreka, California
 K50CT-D in Cottage Grove, Oregon
 K50HZ-D in Willmar, Minnesota, on virtual channel 9, which rebroadcasts KMSP-TV
 KAAL in Austin, Minnesota
 KADO-CD in Shreveport, Louisiana
 KAJB in Calipatria, California
 KASY-TV in Albuquerque, New Mexico
 KAZT-CD in Phoenix, Arizona, on virtual channel 7, which rebroadcasts KAZT-TV
 KBFK-LP in Bakersfield, California
 KBNS-CD in Branson, Missouri
 KBSI in Cape Girardeau, Missouri
 KBTR-CD in Baton Rouge, Louisiana
 KBWU-LD in Richland, etc., Washington
 KCBZ-LD in Casper, Wyoming
 KCDL-LD in Boise, Idaho
 KDOR-TV in Bartlesville, Oklahoma
 KDVR in Denver, Colorado, on virtual channel 31
 KEVC-CD in Indio, California
 KFFS-CD in Fayetteville, Arkansas
 KFPX-TV in Newton, Iowa
 KFRE-TV in Sanger, California
 KFTH-DT in Alvin, Texas, on virtual channel 67
 KFTU-DT in Douglas, Arizona
 KGKM-LD in Columbia, Missouri
 KGMM-CD in San Antonio, Texas
 KHHI-LD in Honolulu, Hawaii
 KHSL-TV in Redding, California
 KICU-TV in San Jose, California, on virtual channel 36
 KIDK in Idaho Falls, Idaho
 KJTB-LD in Paragould, Arkansas
 KJWY-LD in Salem, Oregon, on virtual channel 21, which rebroadcasts KJYY-LD
 KKAP in Little Rock, Arkansas
 KKAX-LD in Hilltop, Arizona
 KKEI-CD in Portland, Oregon, on virtual channel 38, which rebroadcasts KORK-CD
 KLGV-LD in Longview, Texas
 KLMB-CD in El Dorado, Arkansas
 KLML-LD in Grand Junction, Colorado
 KMQV-LD in Rochester, Minnesota, on virtual channel 49
 KNBC in Los Angeles, California, on virtual channel 4
 KPWT-LD in Astoria, Oregon
 KSBO-CD in San Luis Obispo, California
 KSFL-TV in Sioux Falls, South Dakota
 KSHB-TV in Kansas City, Missouri, on virtual channel 41
 KSKN in Spokane, Washington
 KSKT-CD in San Marcos, California, on virtual channel 43
 KTCW in Roseburg, Oregon
 KTFO-CD in Austin, Texas
 KTMF-LD in Kalispell, Montana
 KTPN-LD in Tyler, Texas
 KUEN in Ogden, Utah, on virtual channel 9
 KUIL-LD in Beaumont, Texas
 KUOK-CD in Oklahoma City, Oklahoma
 KUVE-CD in Tucson, Arizona
 KVES-LD in Palm Springs, California
 KVLY-TV in Fargo, North Dakota
 KWYT-LD in Yakima, Washington
 KXTV (DRT) in West Sacramento, California, on virtual channel 10
 KXTX-TV in Dallas, Texas, on virtual channel 39
 KZJO in Seattle, Washington, on virtual channel 22
 KZOD-LD in Odessa, Texas
 W24CP-D in Durham, North Carolina, on virtual channel 24
 W36DO-D in Darby, Pennsylvania
 W36EA-D in Tallahassee, Florida
 W36EC-D in Bartow, Florida, to move to channel 15, on virtual channel 36
 W36EI-D in Wausau, Wisconsin
 W36EO-D in La Grange, Georgia
 W36EP-D in Yauco, Puerto Rico, to move to channel 35, on virtual channel 36
 W36EQ-D in Liberal, Kansas
 W36EX-D in Alton, Illinois, on virtual channel 36
 W36EY-D in Berwick, Pennsylvania
 W36FA-D in Hesperia, Michigan
 W36FB-D in Biscoe, North Carolina
 W36FE-D in Hanover, New Hampshire
 W36FH-D in Traverse City, Michigan
 W36FJ-D in Sebring, Florida, on virtual channel 44, which rebroadcasts WTOG
 W36FK-D in Pittsburgh, Pennsylvania, on virtual channel 46
 W36FM-D in Etna, Maine
 WACY-TV in Appleton, Wisconsin
 WAQP in Saginaw, Michigan
 WASV-LD in Asheville, North Carolina
 WAVE in Louisville, Kentucky
 WBFT-CD in Sanford, North Carolina, on virtual channel 46
 WBXI-CD in Indianapolis, Indiana, on virtual channel 47
 WBXN-CD in New Orleans, Louisiana
 WCAY-CD in Key West, Florida, on virtual channel 36
 WCBS-TV in New York, New York, on virtual channel 2
 WCCU in Urbana, Illinois
 WCEA-LD in Boston, Massachusetts, on virtual channel 26
 WCFE-TV in Plattsburgh, New York
 WDCA in Washington, D.C., uses WTTG's spectrum, on virtual channel 20
 WDSF-LD in Montgomery, Alabama
 WEIN-LD in Evansville, Indiana
 WEPX-TV in Greenville, North Carolina
 WFSB in Hartford, Connecticut, on virtual channel 3
 WFXB in Myrtle Beach, South Carolina
 WFXG in Augusta, Georgia
 WFXR in Roanoke, Virginia
 WGCB-LD in Hinesville-Richmond, Georgia
 WGCW-LD in Albany, Georgia
 WGOX-LD in Mobile, Alabama
 WGTW-TV in Millville, New Jersey, uses WMGM-TV's spectrum, on virtual channel 48
 WHDO-CD in Orlando, Florida, on virtual channel 38
 WHME-TV in South Bend, Indiana
 WIMN-CD in Arecibo, Puerto Rico, on virtual channel 20
 WITF-TV in Harrisburg, Pennsylvania
 WIVB-TV in Buffalo, New York, uses WNLO's spectrum
 WKAS in Ashland, Kentucky
 WKPV in Ponce, Puerto Rico, uses WVOZ-TV's spectrum, on virtual channel 20
 WLEF-TV in Park Falls, Wisconsin
 WLOO in Vicksburg, Mississippi
 WMAV-TV in Oxford, Mississippi
 WMEA-TV in Biddeford, Maine
 WMEC in Macomb, Illinois
 WMGM-TV in Wildwood, New Jersey, on virtual channel 40
 WMKE-CD in Milwaukee, Wisconsin, on virtual channel 21
 WMNT-CD in Toledo, Ohio
 WNGN-LD in Troy, New York
 WNLO in Buffalo, New York
 WNTE-LD in Mayaguez, Puerto Rico, to move to channel 30, on virtual channel 36
 WODP-LD in Fort Wayne, Indiana
 WPMC-CD in Mappsville, Virginia
 WPMT in York, Pennsylvania, uses WITF-TV's spectrum.
 WPXP-TV in Lake Worth, Florida
 WQHS-DT in Cleveland, Ohio, on virtual channel 61
 WQRF-TV in Rockford, Illinois
 WRGT-TV in Dayton, Ohio
 WRID-LD in Richmond, Virginia
 WRJK-LD in Arlington Heights, Illinois
 WSES in Tuscaloosa, Alabama
 WSPF-CD in St. Petersburg, Florida, on virtual channel 3
 WSPX-TV in Syracuse, New York
 WSVF-CD in Harrisonburg, Virginia
 WSWB in Scranton, Pennsylvania
 WTJX-TV in Charlotte Amalie, U.S. Virgin Islands
 WTTG in Washington, D.C., on virtual channel 5
 WTVF in Nashville, Tennessee, on virtual channel 5
 WTVY in Dothan, Alabama
 WUFT in Gainesville, Florida
 WUNE-TV in Linville, North Carolina, on virtual channel 17
 WUPA in Atlanta, Georgia, on virtual channel 69
 WVLR in Tazewell, Tennessee
 WVOZ-TV in Ponce, Puerto Rico, on virtual channel 48
 WWLM-CD in Washington, Pennsylvania, on virtual channel 20
 WXWZ-LD in Guayama, Puerto Rico, on virtual channel 23
 WYCN-LD in Providence, Rhode Island
 WYSJ-CD in Yorktown, Virginia
 WZDT-LP in Naples, Florida

The following stations, which are no longer licensed, formerly broadcast on digital channel 36 in the United States:
 K36AF-D in New Castle, Colorado
 K36HV-D in Wallowa, Oregon
 K36IN-D in Fruitland, etc., Utah
 K36KA-D in Rolla, Missouri
 K36KL-D in Gruver, Texas
 K36MA-D in Perryton, Texas
 K36NJ-D in Monett, Missouri
 K36OK-D in Granite Falls, Minnesota
 K36QI-D in Quartz Creek, etc., Montana
 KZMB-LD in Enid, Oklahoma
 W36BE-D in State College, Pennsylvania
 WCDC-TV in Adams, Massachusetts

References

36 digital